{{DISPLAYTITLE:L-Dopaquinone}}

-Dopaquinone also known as o-dopaquinone is a metabolite of L-DOPA (L-dihydroxyphenylalanine) and a precursor of melanin.

Biosynthesis of melanin occurs in melanocytes, where tyrosine is converted into DOPA and then dopaquinone, which goes on to be formed into pheomelanin or eumelanin.

References

External links 
 

Catecholamines